The Hockey Humanitarian Award is an award that is given annually, since 1996, to a college ice hockey playermale or femalewho has given back to their communities in the true humanitarian spirit.

Selection process
Every year, the foundation board solicits nominations from every NCAA varsity hockey program in the country, male and female, in Divisions I to III.

Leadership
The founding directors of the award are John R. Greenhalgh and Jeffrey Millman, after observing injured Division I player (and their choice as first recipient), J. P. McKersie, coaching their son's minor hockey team. Sponsors of the award include Ulmer & Berne, LLP, the Joyce M. And Herbert W. Stielau Foundation, Brokaw, the American Hockey Coaches Association, and USCHO.com.

Winners
Source

References

^